The Fishbein Trophy is awarded to the player who wins the greatest number of masterpoints at the summer American Contract Bridge League (ACBL) North American Bridge Championship (NABC).

History

The Fishbein Trophy was donated by the ACBL in memory of Sally Fishbein and in recognition of the untiring efforts of Harry Fishbein, who served as ACBL Treasurer and refused to accept the customary compensation.

Winners

Boldface numerals represent a record-breaking number of masterpoints.

See also

Mott-Smith Trophy
Goren Trophy

Sources
 List of previous winners, Page 6. 
 2007 winners, Page 1. 
 2008 winner, Page 1. 
List of Previous winners, page 4

External links
ACBL official website 

+